This is a list of fossiliferous stratigraphic units in Mozambique.



See also 
 Lists of fossiliferous stratigraphic units in Africa
 List of fossiliferous stratigraphic units in Madagascar
 List of fossiliferous stratigraphic units in Malawi
 List of fossiliferous stratigraphic units in South Africa
 List of fossiliferous stratigraphic units in Zambia
 List of fossiliferous stratigraphic units in Zimbabwe
 Geology of Mozambique

References

Further reading 
 F. Dixey and W. C. Smith. 1929. The rocks of the Lupata Gorge and the north side of the Lower Zambezi. Geological Magazine 66(6):241-259
 P. Doyle. 1987. Early Cretaceous belemnites from southern Mozambique. Palaeontology 30(2):311-317
 J.V.L. Rennie. 1937. Fossils from the Lebombo Volcanic Formation. Boletim dos Servicos de Industria, Minas e Geologia. Serie de Geologia e Minas - Memorias e Comunicacoes (1)13-24
 J. F. Verniers, P.P. Jordan, R.V. Paulis, L. Frasca-Spada, and F.R. DeBrock. 1989. The Karoo graben of Metangula, northern Mozambique. Journal of African Earth Sciences 9:137-158

Mozambique
Paleontology in Mozambique
 
Fossiliferous stratigraphic units
Fossil